Think! is the third studio album by James Brown and The Famous Flames, featuring the hit singles "Baby You're Right" and their cover of "Bewildered", along with the group's hit cover of the title track, "Think" originally recorded by The "5" Royales. It also includes the national hits "I'll Go Crazy", "This Old Heart"  and "Baby, You're Right", the 1959 regional hit "Good Good Lovin'", and Brown's B-side hit duet with Bea Ford, "You've Got the Power". In all, the album features no less than seven national Pop and R&B chart hits, and a few regional hits as well.

Track listing
All songs written by James Brown, unless noted otherwise.

References

James Brown albums
1960 albums
King Records (United States) albums
The Famous Flames albums